Kwajalein Jr./Sr. High School is a secondary school in Kwajalein, Marshall Islands. It is a part of Kwajalein Range Services.

The school serves families in the US military and civilians working for the US government.

References

External links
 Kwajalein Junior/Senior High School
 Kwajalein Junior/Senior High School old site at Tripod.com

Kwajalein Atoll
High schools in the Marshall Islands